Paul P. (born 1977) is a Canadian artist known for his work as a painter, sculptor, collagist and graphic artist exploring identity, gender, art history and landscape. He lives and works in Toronto, Ontario.

Career
Paul P. was born in Hamilton, Ontario and grew up in Toronto. He graduated in 2000 with a BFA from from York University in Toronto. He began using only initial of his last name while still a student to single him out from other artists.

Work
Paul P's early work which he described as "melancholic" was drawn from early 80's pre-AIDS era gay pornography, using appropriated photographs from The ArQuives (formerly the Canadian Lesbian and Gay Archives) in Toronto. The New York Times described them as "oddly unsensual". 

Later, he might use photographs taken during his travels, or drawings made by him in the out-of-doors which might become a source for paintings. The nuances of light and atmosphere were primary concerns and his work sometimes has been influenced by figures in art history such as James McNeill Whistler and John Singer Sargent. He also has made sculpture as in his installation "Writing Table for Nancy Mitford" at the 2014 Whitney Biennal.

Selected solo exhibitions
Selected solo exhibitions include: Dusks, Lamplights, The Power Plant, Toronto (2007); Slim Volume, Queer Thoughts, New York (2019); Gamboling Green, Cooper Cole, Toronto (2020); Vespertilians, Maureen Paley, London, England (2022); Friendly in the Knife-edged Moment, Oakville Galleries, Ontario (2022); Early Skirmishes, Hordaland Kunstsenter, Bergen, Norway (2022); and Paul P.: Amor et Mors, National Gallery of Canada (2023), curated by Sonia Del Re, senior curator of Prints and Drawings, of a group of 30 works acquired by the collection in 2020 created by Paul P. between 2003 and 2019, along with about 15 works from the collection.

Selected group exhibitions
 Crack the Sky: Biennale de Montréal, Montreal (2007);
 Compass in Hand, Museum of Modern Art, New York (2009);
 Whitney Biennial, Whitney Museum of American Art, New York (2014);
 Front International, Cleveland Triennial for Contemporary Art, Cleveland (2018);
 Houseguest: Shadows Fall Down, Hammer Museum, Los Angeles (2021)

Publications
Doe Ye Nexte Thynge, 2013 
Last Flowers, Invisible Exports/Downtown Arts, 2012, text by Daniel Reich, 2012 
The Radiant Guest (Paul P. and Scott Treleaven), Publication Studios, Toronto, 2011 
The Pink Book, Daniel Reich Gallery, 2010, text by Harold Montague 
Venice, Venice, Marc Selwyn Fine Art, 2009 
Paul P.- When Ghost Meets Ghost / Peter Hujar, Maureen Paley, 2008, text by Vince Aletti 
Blue and Silver, Galerie Thaddaeus Ropac, 2007, text by Francois Jonquet 
Nonchaloir, Powerhouse books, 2007, text by Collier Schorr 
Places Names, the Place, Daniel Reich Gallery, 2007, text by David Velasco 
The Yellow Room, Marc Selwyn Fine Art, 2006, text by Vince Aletti 
Grey and Gold, Galerie Thaddaeus Ropac, 2005, text by Michel Bulteau

Collections
 The Speed Art Museum, Louisville, Kentucky  
 Princeton University Art Museum, Princeton 
 Museum of Art Rhode Island School of Art, Providence  
 Museum of Modern Art, New York 
 Glenbow Museum, Calgary Alberta  
 Brooklyn Museum, Brooklyn
 Art Gallery of Ontario, Toronto
 National Gallery of Canada, Ottawa
 Whitney Museum of American Art, New York
 Hammer Museum, Los Angeles

References

External links
 Doe Ye Nexte Thynge

1977 births
Artists from Toronto
Canadian contemporary painters
Canadian printmakers
Canadian installation artists
20th-century Canadian painters
Canadian male painters
21st-century Canadian painters
York University alumni
Living people
20th-century Canadian printmakers
Canadian gay artists
20th-century Canadian male artists
21st-century Canadian male artists
21st-century Canadian LGBT people
20th-century Canadian LGBT people